Route 104, or Highway 104, may refer to:

Brazil
 BR-104

Canada
 New Brunswick Route 104
 Nova Scotia Highway 104 (Trans-Canada Highway)
 Prince Edward Island Route 104
 Quebec Route 104

China
 China National Highway 104

Costa Rica
 National Route 104

Japan
 Japan National Route 104

Korea, South
 Namhae Expressway Branch 2

Philippines
 N104 highway (Philippines)

United States
 U.S. Route 104 (former)
 Alabama State Route 104
 Arkansas Highway 104
 Arkansas Highway 104 (1926–2000) (former)
 California State Route 104
 Connecticut Route 104
 Florida State Road 104
 Georgia State Route 104
 Illinois Route 104
 Indiana State Road 104
 K-104 (Kansas highway)
 Kentucky Route 104
 Louisiana Highway 104
 Maine State Route 104
 Maryland Route 104
 Massachusetts Route 104
 M-104 (Michigan highway)
 Minnesota State Highway 104
 Missouri Route 104
 Nebraska Highway 104 (1935–1950) (former)
 Nebraska Highway 104 (1950–1957) (former)
 Nebraska State Spur 104 (former)
 New Hampshire Route 104
 County Route 104 (Bergen County, New Jersey)
 County Route S104 (Bergen County, New Jersey)
 New Mexico State Road 104
 New York State Route 104
 County Route 104 (Cortland County, New York)
 County Route 104 (Dutchess County, New York)
 County Route 104 (Fulton County, New York)
 County Route 104 (Montgomery County, New York)
 County Route 104 (Nassau County, New York)
 County Route 104 (Niagara County, New York)
 County Route 104 (Orleans County, New York)
 County Route 104 (Rensselaer County, New York)
 County Route 104 (Suffolk County, New York)
 County Route 104 (Sullivan County, New York)
 County Route 104 (Ulster County, New York)
 County Route 104 (Westchester County, New York)
 North Carolina Highway 104
 Ohio State Route 104
 Oklahoma State Highway 104
 Oregon Route 104
 Pennsylvania Route 104
 Rhode Island Route 104
  Tennessee State Route 104
 Texas State Highway 104 (former)
 Farm to Market Road 104
 Utah State Route 104
 Vermont Route 104
 Virginia State Route 104 (1923-1928) (former)
 Virginia State Route 104 (1928-1933) (former)
 Virginia State Route 104 (1933-1949) (former)
 Virginia State Route 104 (pre-2001) (former)
 Washington State Route 104
 West Virginia Route 104
 Wisconsin Highway 104

Territories
 Puerto Rico Highway 104
 U.S. Virgin Islands Highway 104

See also
List of highways numbered 104A
List of highways numbered 104B
List of A104 roads
B104 road
D104 road
N104 (France)
P104
R104 road (Ireland)
R104 (South Africa)